Durrani or Abdali is the name of a chief Sarbani Pashtun tribal confederation in Afghanistan and Pakistan. It is also a surname. Notable people with the surname include:

Historical
Ahmad Shah Durrani, founder of the Durrani Empire, which he ruled from 1747 to 1772
Mahmud Shah Durrani, ruled the Durrani Empire from 1801 to 1803 and again from 1809 to 1818
Ali Shah Durrani, ruled the Durrani Empire from 1818 to 1819
Ayub Shah Durrani, ruled the Durrani Empire from 1819 to 1823
Shah Shujah Durrani, ruled the Durrani Empire from 1803 to 1809
Timur Shah Durrani, ruled the Durrani Empire from 1772 to 1793
Zaman Shah Durrani, ruled the Durrani Empire from 1793 to 1800
Shahzada Kamran Durrani, son of Mahmud Shah Durrani and an Emir of Afghanistan

Sports
Abdul Wahid Durrani, Pakistani international footballer
Salim Durani, Indian cricketer
Ahmed Shah Durrani (umpire) cricket umpire.

Armed forces
Abdur Rahim Durrani, retired Brigadier General of Pakistan Army who served as Governor of Baluchistan province of Pakistan from 1994 to 1995
Asad Durrani, director-general of Pakistan's Inter-Services Intelligence from 1990 to 1992 and director-general of the Pakistani Army's Military Intelligence
Hakeemullah Khan Durrani, Chief of Air Staff of Pakistan's Air Force from 1988 to 1991
Mahmood Khan Durrani, British Indian Army Captain in Malaya during World War II, awarded the medal for heroism while a Prisoner of War of the Japanese Army
Mahmud Ali Durrani, retired two-star rank general officer, author of security studies, and a former National Security Adviser to Pervez Musharraf, serving from 2008 to 2009
Nasir Durrani, Inspector General of Police of Khyber Pakhtunkhwa from 2013 to 2017 and brought revolutionary changes in KP Chapter Police Department.

Criminals
Amin Durrani, one of 17 people detained on 2–3 June 2006 in Toronto, Canada in the 2006 Toronto terrorism arrests

Politicians
Ayatullah Durrani, former Member of the National Assembly of Pakistan and former Minister of State for Industries and Production
Asif Durrani, Ambassador of Pakistan to the United Arab Emirates
Rahila Hameed Khan Durrani, Speaker of the Provincial Assembly of Balochistan since 24 December 2015

Film industry
Ejaz Durrani, Pakistani film actor, director and producer active from 1956 to 1984
Ghulam Mustafa Durrani, Indian Radio Drama Artist, playback singer, actor and music director
Iqbal Durrani, an Indian writer, director, actor and producer of Hindi films

Others
Hayatullah Khan Durrani, Pakistani cave explorer, mountaineer, environmentalist, organizer, and a rescuer
Hazeem Durrani, a fictional character from the BBC soap opera Doctors
Shahkur Ullah Durrani, managing director of Pakistan International Airlines and Governor of the State Bank of Pakistan

Authors
Attash Durrani, Pakistani linguist, researcher, critic and author
Mohammad Abubakar Durrani, Pakistani canoeist
Tehmina Durrani, Pakistani women's rights activist and author
Maryam Durrani, Author of 'Assasin'

See also
Deoni, the Jagir where Deoni cattle breeding farm was initiated by the Durrani Brothers.

Pakistani names
Surnames of Pakistani origin
Pashto-language surnames